is a male Japanese retired male medley swimmer.

Swimming career
Kinugasa represented Japan at two consecutive Summer Olympics, starting in 1992. He is best known for winning two gold medals at the 1997 Summer Universiade in Catania, Italy.

Despite being of Japanese nationality he won the 200 metres medley title  and the 400 metres medley title in 1997, at the ASA National British Championships.

References

1974 births
Living people
Japanese male medley swimmers
Olympic swimmers of Japan
Swimmers at the 1992 Summer Olympics
Swimmers at the 1996 Summer Olympics
Asian Games medalists in swimming
Universiade medalists in swimming
Asian Games silver medalists for Japan
Asian Games bronze medalists for Japan
Swimmers at the 1994 Asian Games
Medalists at the 1994 Asian Games
Universiade gold medalists for Japan
Universiade silver medalists for Japan
Universiade bronze medalists for Japan
Medalists at the 1995 Summer Universiade
Medalists at the 1997 Summer Universiade
20th-century Japanese people